The British Student Taekwondo Federation (BSTF) is a national student sport federation and registered charity. 
The organisation was founded in 1986 and provides services and events to university Taekwondo clubs across the United Kingdom including the mutli-discipline Student Taekwondo Championships Series tournament programme. In 2019 the charity partnered with British Universities and Colleges Sport (BUCS), the governing body for university sport in the United Kingdom, to deliver the new BSTF BUCS Student Taekwondo Championships Series joining over 30,000 student-athletes across more than 50 sports within the BUCS core competition programme.

The charity also delivers training camps; referee training courses; British Universities and Colleges Sport (BUCS) qualification tournaments and team management of the European Universities Games and Championships squads; an inter-university composite national team training programme for performance student-athletes; BUCS London University Sports League tournaments; support for university clubs hosting their own training events and university open tournaments; award an annual Club of the Year Award, and provides advocacy and advice available to all university taekwondo clubs across the UK.

The charitable objects of the BSTF are: "the advancement for the public benefit of physical education among students in Universities and Colleges by the provision of services and promotion of the martial art and amateur sport of Taekwondo".

History 
The BSTF was established in 1986 as a not-for-profit organisation to facilitate university Taekwondo clubs to train and compete together. The present day BSTF BUCS Taekwondo Championships Series developed from these annual Student National Taekwondo Championships competitions, known colloquially by university taekwondo club members as "the Nationals"; The first Nationals were organised in 1987 and were held at the University of Southampton. The event began as a collaboration between students of Southampton and Warwick University's Taekwondo clubs, including one of the BSTF's founding members and current patron of the charity master Graham Jones. The inaugural championships included student teams from the University of Southampton, Southampton Technical College (now Southampton City College), Leeds University and Warwick University.

By 1989 the organisation had evolved into a constituted national organising committee to cater for the expanding event. The first Student National Taekwondo Championships included only the WTF rules sparring discipline, with ITF rules sparring added in 1992 and various individual, pairs and team patterns events being added over time. The most recent edition to the competition programme is the Freestyle Patterns discipline added to the Student National Taekwondo Championships event in 2017 as an additional qualification event for the European University Sports Association's European Universities Games and European Universities Championships Taekwondo programme.

Membership of the BSTF is open to all university Taekwondo clubs which are themselves members of their respective students' unions. Representatives of each member club may vote on motions and in trustee elections at the charity's general meetings. The BSTF's events and tournaments are open to all university student Taekwondo athletes – including independent entries from universities which do not yet possess a student union registered Taekwondo club.

Student National Taekwondo Championships
The Student National Taekwondo Championships Series comprises several multi-discipline tournaments each year, which the largest university Taekwondo events in Great Britain. The series typically attracts over 500 student athletes from over 50 universities across Great Britain taking part, with around 30 highest ranking athletes qualifying at the event to represent their institutions at the EUSA European Universities Games (in even years) and EUSA European Universities Championships (in odd years).

Five Taekwondo disciplines are contested at the annual Student National Taekwondo Championships, with competitors sub-grouped by grade (experience level) divisions and also by weight divisions for sparring disciplines. The events programme includes: ITF rules sparring; WT rules sparring; Chang-Hon patterns (individual, pair and team Tul); Kukkiwon patterns (individual, pair, and team Poomsae); and Freestyle patterns. BSTF competitions are contested according to the rules of the pertinent international federations, WT and the ITF.

Competitors accrue points for their registered institution for every single sparring match win / patterns round progressed at every event in the tournament series towards their institution's overall Student National Taekwondo Championships ranking at the end of the year. The table below shows the history of overall club champions based on overall team score.

from 1986-2017 the title was awarded based on overall team scores from all disciplines and divisions of a Student National Taekwondo Championships Finals event only, irrespective of other competition results, while from the 2017-18 season onward the title awarded based on overall team scores from all disciplines and divisions across the multi-event championships series.

References 

Taekwondo organizations
Taekwondo in the United Kingdom
Taekwondo
Sports organizations established in 1986
Student sports governing bodies